The Hatter's Ghost is a 1982 film directed by Claude Chabrol. It is based on the 1947 story Le Petit Tailleur et le Chapelier by Georges Simenon. It takes place in Brittany and was shot in the towns of Concarneau and Quimper.

Plot
Labbé, a hatter in a French provincial town, appears to lead the life of a respectable citizen but is in fact a serial murderer. The only person to suspect this is his neighbour, Kachoudas, an Armenian tailor. After Labbé kills his own wife, he kills six of her friends to stop them from visiting her and prepares to murder a seventh, who dies naturally. As a substitute, he murders the maid. Labbé soon confesses his crime to the dying Kachoudas. After getting drunk, he visits his favourite prostitute, Berthe, and kills her; he is found at the scene of the crime in the morning by police.

Principal cast

Critical reception
TV Guide rated the film with 2 1/2 out of 5 stars and commented:

From Time Out London:

References

External links 

Scene from Youtube

1982 films
1980s psychological thriller films
Films directed by Claude Chabrol
Films based on Belgian novels
Films set in the 1960s
French psychological thriller films
French serial killer films
Films based on works by Georges Simenon
1980s French-language films
1980s French films